The Réseau express métropolitain (REM) is a light metro rapid transit system under construction in Greater Montreal, Quebec, Canada. When completed in 2024, the system will link several Montreal suburbs, and eventually in 2027, Montréal–Trudeau International Airport with Downtown Montreal. The former Deux-Montagnes line is being converted to light metro standards.

The  light metro rail system is projected to cost $6.9billion. It will be independent of—but connect to—the existing Montreal Metro, operated by the STM. Trains on the network will be fully automated and driverless, and it will become the fifth-longest automated transportation system in the world, after the Singapore Mass Rapid Transit, Kuala Lumpur Rapid KL, Vancouver SkyTrain, and Dubai Metro.

The first section between Brossard and Central Station is expected to open in the second quarter of 2023.

History
On 13 January 2015, Quebec Premier Philippe Couillard and Michael Sabia, CEO of Caisse de dépôt et placement du Québec (CDPQ), agreed to a partnership in which the Crown corporation could assume financing for major transportation projects in the province, with $7.4billion planned to be spent on infrastructure from 2014 to 2024. Two of these projects were the South Shore Line and the Train de l'Ouest toward the West Island, which eventually merged to become the core of the REM project.

On 22 April 2016, Sabia and Montreal Mayor Denis Coderre unveiled the project, then known as the Réseau électrique métropolitain, to the media. The estimated completion date for the first portion of the system was December 2020. On 22 June 2016, CDPQ Infra published two requests for qualification: one for the engineering, procurement and construction contract and the other for the rolling stock, systems, operation, and maintenance. The estimated value of the two contracts are $4billion and $1.5billion respectively.

On 25 November 2016, CDPQ Infra announced the addition of three new stations to the project. These new stations—Central Station, McGill, and Édouard-Montpetit—would improve downtown Montreal service by integrating the REM with the Metro system through connections to the Orange, Green and Blue Lines. Included with news of the 3 new stations was an increased price tag of $5.9billion for the entire project.

On 15 June 2017, the Government of Canada pledged $1.28billion to finance the project, completing the financing of the project. Construction on the project was announced as starting at the end of 2017.

On 1 December 2017, the CDPQ extended the tender process on the project to the end of January 2018, citing a need for additional discussions with the bidders.

Procurement 

On 28 June 2016, CDPQ Infra launched two public tenders in parallel: one for "Engineering, Procurement and Construction" (EPC, or "Ingénierie, Approvisionnement et Construction des infrastructures" (IAC) in French), and a second, for "Rolling Stock, Systems and Operation and Maintenance Services" (RSSOM, or "Fourniture du Matériel Roulant, de Systèmes de conduite automatique et de Services d'Exploitation et de Maintenance" (MRSEM) in French). Following a prequalification phase, the Caisse's subsidiary announced, on 10 November 2016, the qualified candidates that would be allowed to submit a bid:
 For the EPC contract, the competitors were the Groupe NouvLR consortium composed of SNC-Lavalin Grands Projets, Dragados, Aecon, Pomerleau, EPC and AECOM and the Kiewit-Eurovia consortium formed by Kiewit Corporation, Eurovia, WSP Global and Parsons Corporation;
 For the RSSOM contract, three companies and consortia were in competition: Bombardier Transportation alone, Alliance Montréal Mobilité (composed of Parsons Corporation, Hyundai Rotem, RATP Dev and Thales Canada) and the Groupe des Partenaires pour la Mobilité des Montréalais (associating Alstom and SNC-Lavalin O&M). Ansaldo STS-Hitachi and China Railway International Co. were not allowed to bid.

According to LaPresse, final bids were submitted to CDPQ Infra on 27 October 2017. On 10 November 2017, the date of the planned announcement of the selected contractors, the procurement process was "postponed indefinitely" to provide more time for analysis and evaluation of the bids received. On 8 February 2018, CDPQ Infra finally announced its selection: Groupe NouvLR consortium for the EPC contract (SNC-Lavalin Grands Projets, Dragados, Aecon, Pomerleau, EBC and AECOM) and the Groupe des Partenaires pour la Mobilité des Montréalais for the RSSOM contract (Alstom and SNC-Lavalin O&M). The contracts' value is estimated to be around $6.3billion, of which approximately 80% is for the EPC contract.

Construction 

Preparatory work began in late March 2018. On 12 April 2018, the project broke ground officially.

In December 2019, CDPQ revised the capital cost of the project to $6.5billion, an increase of $230million.

In November 2020, a disruption from an "unexpected" explosion during the renovation of the Mont Royal Tunnel, likely caused by century-old explosives, delayed the opening of the central section of the REM from 2022 to 2023.

In June 2021, CDPQ updated the project costs to $6.9billion, an increase of $350million, citing impacts from the COVID-19 pandemic in Montreal. In June 2022, CDPQ Infra acknowledged that construction issues with the Mount Royal Tunnel, labour shortages and material supply issues would postpone the opening of most REM stations to 2024. The delay had also resulted in higher costs for the project overall, exceeding the last projected budget estimate of $6.9billion. No new estimate of the project cost was provided.

Route
The primary route follows the Mount Royal Tunnel, where new underground stations are being built to connect with the existing  and  Metro stations. A new connection to the Mascouche commuter rail line will be built near the A-40 at the Côte-de-Liesse station to allow this line that previously used the tunnel to have access to downtown.

Southeast from Central Station, the line follows existing rail lines until Marc-Cantin Street, where it transitions to an elevated guideway and crosses to Nuns' Island, and then uses a rail deck constructed on the new Champlain Bridge to cross the St. Lawrence River. Three stations in Brossard on the South Shore have been built: Panama, connecting to the existing bus terminal; Du Quartier, directly connected to the DIX30 commercial district; and Brossard, a future bus terminus.

The northwest branch will be a direct conversion of the existing Deux-Montagnes line, with a doubling of the tracks beyond Bois-Franc station. On the West Island, a new airport branch will separate near the A-13, with a stop in Technoparc Saint-Laurent before terminating at Montréal–Pierre Elliott Trudeau International Airport. The other branch will follow an existing freight rail spur through Pointe-Claire, then follow the Quebec A-40 alignment just east of St-Jean Boulevard and continue through Kirkland before ending in Sainte-Anne-de-Bellevue.

In the city centre, three stations are being built to connect with existing Metro lines: McGill will connect with the Green Line, Édouard-Montpetit will connect with the Blue Line, and Bonaventure Gare Centrale will connect with the Orange Line.

Rolling stock 

The REM uses 106 Alstom Metropolis trains arranged in two-car sets for a total of 212 cars. At rush hour, trains will be paired together in four-car sets. The external livery is white, grey, and bright green, matching the REM logo. The trains are fully automated with no driver cabs within the cars. Each pair of cars has a capacity of approximately 300 people.

Stations
The REM will consist of 26 stations on three branches. Twelve of these stations are on the former suburban Deux-Montagnes line and will become part of the REM after being converted to rapid transit standards. Several have received new names since the project's inception.

South Shore and Central section (all branches)

All stations on the main branch of the Réseau express métropolitain are projected to have a train frequency of 2.5 minutes during rush hour and every 5 minutes otherwise, both towards Brossard station and towards the three different branches.

Deux-Montagnes branch
Stations on the Deux-Montagnes branch are projected to run every five minutes during rush hour, and every fifteen minutes otherwise.

Anse-à-l'Orme branch

The Anse-à-l'Orme (formerly Sainte-Anne-de-Bellevue) branch of the Réseau express métropolitain is projected to run every ten minutes during rush hour, and every fifteen minutes otherwise.

Airport branch

The Airport branch of the Réseau express métropolitain is projected to run every ten minutes during rush hour and every fifteen minutes otherwise.

Controversies
In a report prepared by the Bureau d'audiences publiques sur l'environnement (BAPE) and released on 20 January 2017, the project was criticized for failing to provide crucial information on the project's financial model, environmental impact, as well as the impact on ridership levels throughout the public transit network across Montreal. Without such information, the BAPE declared that it was "premature to authorize the approval of this project". The BAPE also stated that CDPQ Infra had not met its obligations for transparency, as it had failed to provide information in a timely fashion on the ridership levels of the REM's three branches. The CDPQ Infra was also reproached for not studying the impact of the REM on existing public transit authorities. CDPQ Infra was criticized for not being able to answer questions like how much tickets would cost, whether municipalities on the REM would themselves have to pay for the necessary infrastructure for access to it, and whether municipalities would also have to contribute to the REM's operation.

A lawsuit filed by Coalition Climat further alleged that the REM project violated federalism for a lack of federal assessment of the potential harm to citizens' environmental rights by its potential contribution to noise pollution and urban heat islands. The lawsuit was dismissed by the Quebec Superior Court on 13 December 2017.

Another controversy occurred in November 2019, when Montreal mayor Valerie Plante proposed naming Griffintown's REM station after controversial politician Bernard Landry, sparking a backlash from the city's Irish community. As a compromise, the station was named , which still proved controversial.

Proposed lines, stations, and extensions

On 20 May 2019, the Quebec government announced that it had requested CDPQi to study two REM extensions. The government also made a request to determine the best electrified transit system to be put in place for the East Island, with the possibility of it being a new REM line. The proposal became the REM de l'Est Project.

Dorval station
The federal government requested the Canadian Infrastructure Bank study a possible extension of the REM to Dorval Exo train station and to Dorval Via Rail station to connect with Exo and Via Rail trains. This station would be about a  extension from the Airport station. The STM bus station is located south of the CP, CN tracks and west of the Via Rail station.

Bridge-Bonaventure station
The city of Montreal requested two stations, instead of one station, at Bassin Peel.

REM de l'Est

Announced in 2020, it would use the existing REM technology but not connect directly to the first section of the network.

Beginning at Robert-Bourassa, the line would run east on an elevated guideway along the banks of the St. Lawrence River until St-Clément, where it would turn north and split into two branches:
one running elevated along Sherbrooke Street to Pointe-aux-Trembles 
one diving into a tunnel and running north to Cégep Marie-Victorin via Lacordaire, Laval and Lanaudière

The REM de l'Est would add 23 new stations:

South Shore "REM 2.0" branch 
In partnership with the City of Longueuil and the Municipality of Brossard, the Quebec government announced an extension of the REM through the South Shore of Montreal. This branch has been referred to as "REM 2.0" and is planned to connect the existing REM line at Terminus Panama to the Montreal metro at Terminus Longueuil. The REM 2.0 would follow the axis of Taschereau Boulevard for much of its length, superseding earlier proposals for an electric tramway, the "East–West Electric Line" (Lien électrique est–ouest or LÉEO), to connect these transit hubs. The Quebec government suggested that this REM line could ultimately continue in either direction to the municipalities of Châteauguay and Boucherville respectively.

See also
 
 Urban rail transit in Canada

References

External links

 
 Presentation of the project on the CDPQ Infra website

 
Exo (public transit)
Proposed railway lines in Canada
Airport rail links in Canada
Electric railways in Canada
Standard gauge railways in Canada
1500 V DC railway electrification
2023 in rail transport